Adâncata may refer to:

Adâncata, Ialomița, a commune in Ialomiţa County, Romania
Adâncata, Suceava, a commune in Suceava County, Romania
Adâncata, a village in Goiești Commune, Dolj County, Romania
Adâncata, the Romanian name for Hlyboka, Ukraine

See also
Adâncata River